John Nichols Dalton (July 11, 1931July 30, 1986) was an American politician who served as the 63rd governor of Virginia, from 1978 to 1982.  Dalton won the office with 55.9% of the vote, defeating Democrat Henry E. Howell Jr. and Independent Alan R. Ogden. Dalton had previously served as Lieutenant Governor of Virginia.

Biography

Born in Emporia, Virginia, Dalton graduated from the College of William and Mary in Williamsburg, Virginia, and the University of Virginia Law School.  He served in both houses of the General Assembly (Virginia House of Delegates, 1966–1972, Senate of Virginia, 1973).  Dalton was the 32nd Lieutenant Governor from 1974 to 1978.  As governor, he pursued policies of limited government. He also settled the federal lawsuit on the desegregation of Virginia's institutions of higher education.

Dalton was the adopted son of Theodore Roosevelt Dalton, his uncle, who was the Republican candidate for governor in 1953 and 1957.  As a young man his next-door neighbor was Charlotte Giesen, first Republican woman elected to the House of Delegates.  Dalton died at 55 of lung cancer. He is buried at Sunrise Burial Park in Radford.

His personal papers, including those from his time as governor, are held by the Special Collections Research Center at the College of William & Mary. His executive papers from his time as governor are held by the Library of Virginia. Dalton Intermediate School, in Radford, Virginia, is named after the former governor.  Dalton Hall, a building at Radford University that houses dining facilities, and the university bookstore is named for Dalton.

Dalton's son-in-law, Steve Baril, sought the 2005 Republican nomination for attorney general of Virginia.

References

Virginia Governor John Nichols Dalton, National Governors Association
John N. Dalton, 1978–1982, UVa Cooper Center
The Legacy of Governor Dalton by John Chichester

External links
Finding aid for the John Dalton Papers

|-

|-

|-

1931 births
1986 deaths
20th-century American lawyers
20th-century American politicians
American adoptees
College of William & Mary alumni
Deaths from cancer in Virginia
Deaths from lung cancer
Republican Party governors of Virginia
Lieutenant Governors of Virginia
Republican Party members of the Virginia House of Delegates
Virginia lawyers
Republican Party Virginia state senators
People from Emporia, Virginia
People from Radford, Virginia